Gaioni is an Italian surname. Notable people with the surname include:

Cristina Gaioni (born 1939), Italian actress
Giacomo Gaioni (1905–1988), Italian cyclist

Italian-language surnames